Intelligence Squared is a media company that organizes live debates and other cultural events around the world. It was founded in 2002 in London, where its head office is based, and has affiliates in the US, Australia, and Hong Kong. The debates are held in the traditional Oxford style in front of a live audience. The company produces video and podcast programs, publishing on YouTube, and other platforms. Intelligence Squared is often referred to as Intelligence2 and IQ2.

History
Intelligence Squared was founded by two media entrepreneurs, Jeremy O'Grady and John Gordon, in 2002. In 2012, the company was bought by art consultant Amelie von Wedel, Yana Peel (CEO of Serpentine Galleries), and David Legg (Commonwealth Bank of Australia Executive General Manager). Hannah Kaye has been executive producer since 2006, and Matt McAllester became managing director in 2018. In addition to debates, Intelligence Squared also hosts interviews, discussions, and panels with such figures as President Jimmy Carter, Eric Schmidt, Sheryl Sandberg, Malala Yousafzai, Patti Smith, and Werner Herzog.

Intelligence Squared licensed the rights to the brand for global expansion and Intelligence Squared U.S. Debates was established in 2006 as a nonpartisan, nonprofit media group by financier and philanthropist Robert Rosenkranz. The organization's mission is stated as being to "restore critical thinking, facts, reason, and civility to American public discourse." 

Other Intelligence Squared licensees operate in Sydney (since 2008) and Hong Kong (since 2009). The company has also had partnerships in Kyiv (2008 – 2014), Athens (2010), Israel (2013), and Chile (2014). IQ2 debates in Australia are hosted by The Ethics Centre in Sydney.

Debate format
Intelligence Squared uses the traditional Oxford-Style debate format inspired by the Oxford Union. A motion is proposed, with two speakers arguing in favour and two against. Opening remarks are around 10 minutes in length. This is followed by questions and answers from the live audience, a lively dialogue between the speakers, and short closing remarks by each debater in turn. The audience is polled on their opinion both before and after the debate and the winning side is determined by the side which changed the most minds.

Another format they produce are "Cultural Combat" debates, in which two cultural figures are pitted against each other. These began in 2013 with "Verdi vs. Wagner", which was staged at London’s Royal Opera House with a sixty-piece live orchestra, Stephen Fry in the chair, and John Tomlinson singing Wotan.

Debate topics include foreign policy, religion, history, social policy, politics, economics, science, technology, art, culture, and the environment.

Intelligence Squared U.S.

Intelligence Squared U.S. Debates was established in the United States in 2006 as a nonpartisan, nonprofit institution with a mission to "raise the level of public discourse" in America. An award-winning national radio program, podcast, television show, and digital platform, Intelligence Squared U.S. has produced more than 200 live debates since 2006 and made history by hosting the first debate ever between an artificial intelligence and a human being, in partnership with IBM's "Project Debater”. Intelligence Squared U.S. is often referred to as IQ2US.

Intelligence Squared U.S. episodes have been broadcast on NPR since 2007, in addition to Bloomberg Television, BBC, PBS, Newsy, C-SPAN, and education streaming platform Wondrium.

Podcast and video
All Intelligence Squared events are recorded and released on the company’s YouTube channel and as part of a weekly podcast series. The company also records podcasts with authors and other intellectuals.

Television
Intelligence Squared debates have also been broadcast globally on BBC World.

Partnerships
Intelligence Squared has partnered with The New York Times, Google, and Vanity Fair. 

The first Intelligence Squared and Google VERSUS debate series held its first debate, titled "It's Time to End the War on Drugs", on 13 March 2012. Intelligence Squared has also staged events in partnership with Shell on topics related to climate change and sustainable energy use. Other partnerships include The National Trust, Wellington College, Abbey Road Studios, Baker McKenzie in New York City, Investec, Christie's, the World Health Organization in New York, the United Nations in Geneva, and the University of Chicago.

References

External links
 
 Intelligence Squared on YouTube
 Intelligence Squared U.S. Website

Debating